Nail fold or nailfold may refer to:

Eponychium, a proximal nail fold
Paronychium, a lateral nail fold